Wan Chao-Chan (1906–1992) was born in Nanjing, China.  He was one of the Wan brothers who pioneered the Chinese animations industry.

History
He joined his other brothers Wan Laiming in most of the animation projects that came after the experimentations.

Filmography

References

External links
 China Movie DB

Chinese animators
Film directors from Jiangsu
20th-century Chinese inventors
Cinema pioneers
1906 births
1992 deaths
Artists from Nanjing
Chinese film directors
Chinese animated film directors
Chinese animated film producers